Megu Uyama (宇山芽紅, born 14 January 1996) is a Japanese individual and synchronized trampoline gymnast, who has represented her country at four World Championships, as well as the 2018 Asian Games.

Uyama won the gold medal in the women’s synchro event alongside Hikaru Mori at the 2018 Trampoline Gymnastics World Championships, becoming the first female gymnasts from Japan to win a World Championship gold in trampolining. She was also part of the Japanese team that won the gold at the 2019 Trampoline Gymnastics World Championships.

Uyama was selected to represent Japan at the 2020 Summer Olympics. She qualified to the women’s trampoline final where she finished fifth.

She graduated from Kanazawa Gakuin University with a degree in Sport Studies in 2018.

References

External links 

Living people
1996 births
People from Kanazawa, Ishikawa
Japanese female trampolinists
Gymnasts at the 2018 Asian Games
Asian Games competitors for Japan
Medalists at the Trampoline Gymnastics World Championships
Gymnasts at the 2020 Summer Olympics
21st-century Japanese women